
Stein is a surname with different origins. It is a common German name. The name derived from German means "stone" or "rock”. Additionally, the Scottish name (also Steen) is a form of the name Steven. 

Notable people with the surname include:

A 
 Aaron Marc Stein (1906–1985), nom-de-plume of American novelist George Bagby
 Abby Stein (born 1991), transgender activist, writer, and public speaker
 Allan Stein, nephew of Gertrude Stein and the title of a novel by Matthew Stadler
 Alon Stein (born 1991), Israeli basketball player
 Andrew Stein (born 1945), American politician
 Andy Stein, American saxophone and violin player
 Arthur Stein (political scientist) (born 1950), American professor of political science
 Aurel Stein (1862–1943), Hungarian-British archaeologist

B 
 Ben Stein (born 1944), American actor, writer, and attorney
 Blake Stein (born 1973), American baseball pitcher
 Boris Shtein (or Stein) (1892–1961), Soviet diplomat
 Brian Stein (born 1957), English association football player
 Burton Stein (1926–1996), American historian

C 
 Charles Stein (disambiguation), several people
 Charlotte von Stein (1742–1827), lady-in-waiting at the court in Weimar 
 Clarence Stein (1882–1975), American urban planner, architect, and writer
 Colin Stein (born 1947), Scottish footballer
 Chris Stein (born 1950), American guitarist

D 
 Daniel Stein (disambiguation), several people
 David Stein (disambiguation), several people
 Dieter Stein (born 1967), German journalist

E 
 Edith Stein (1891–1942), German philosopher, Catholic saint
 Eduardo Stein (born 1945), Guatemalan diplomat and politician
 Elias M. Stein (1931–2018), American mathematician
 Ernst Stein (1891–1945), Austrian Byzantinist
 Erwin Stein (1885–1958), Austrian musician and writer
 Evaleen Stein (1863-1923), American author, limner

F 
 Freimut Stein (1924–1986), German figure skater
 Fritz Stein (1879–1961), German theologian, conductor, musicologist and church musician

G 
 Garth Stein (born 1964), American author, film producer, playwright, and teacher
 Georg Stein (1909–1980s), German chess master
 Gertrude Stein (1874–1947), American novelist, poet, playwright, and art collector
 Gladys Marie Stein (1900-1989) American author and composer
 Gordon Stein (1941–1996), American author, physiologist, and activist
 Greg Stein (born 1967), American programmer, speaker, and open-source software advocate

H 
 Heinrich Friedrich Karl vom und zum Stein (1757–1831), Prussian statesman
 Herb Stein (1898–1980), American football player
 Herbert Stein (1916–1999), American economist
 Herman Stein (1915–2007), American composer
 Horst Stein (1928–2008), German conductor

J 
 Jason Stein, American college baseball coach
 James Stein (c.1804-1877), Australian  pastoralist
 Jake Stein (born 1994), Australian rules footballer
 Jimmy Stein (1907–?), Scottish association footballer
 Jill Stein (born 1950), American politician and presidential candidate
 Jock Stein (1922–1985), Scottish football manager
 Johann Andreas Stein (1728–1792), German maker of keyboard instruments
 John Stein (disambiguation)
 Joseph Allen Stein (1912–2001), American architect
 Jules C. Stein (1896–1981), American musician, physician, and business leader

K 
 Karl Stein (mathematician) (1913–2000), German mathematician
 Konrad Stein (1892–1960), German wrestler

L 
 Lena Stein-Schneider (1874-1958) German composer
 Leo Stein (1872-1947), American art critic and brother of Gertrude Stein
 Leon Stein (1910–2002), American composer and music analyst
 Leonid Stein (1934–1973), Soviet chess grandmaster

M 
 Mary Kay Stein, American mathematics educator
 Mathias Stein (born 1970), German politician

P 
 Peter Stein (disambiguation)
 Philip Stein (1919–2009), American painter

R 
 Rick Stein (born 1947), English chef, restaurateur and television presenter
 Robert Stein (disambiguation), several people

S 
 Samuel Friedrich Stein (1818–1885), Czech entomologist 
 Stanley J. Stein (1920–2019), American historian

W 
 William A. Stein (born 1974), American mathematician
 William Howard Stein (1911–1980), American biochemist

Fictional characters
 Chase Stein, a superhero in the Marvel Comics series Runaways
 Franken Stein, a mad scientist in the manga and anime series Soul Eater
 Franny K. Stein, the titular character of an ongoing children's series by Jim Benton
 Martin Stein, one half of the original incarnation of the DC comics superhero Firestorm

See also
Stine, a surname and given name

References

German-language surnames
Jewish surnames
Scottish surnames